Salt Creek is a stream in St. Clair County in the U.S. state of Missouri. It is a tributary of the Osage River.

Salt Creek was named for the fact ranchers left salt near its banks in order to nourish their cattle.

References

Rivers of St. Clair County, Missouri
Rivers of Missouri